{{DISPLAYTITLE:11e régiment parachutiste de choc}}

The 11e régiment parachutiste de choc ("11th shock parachute regiment), often called 11e choc, was an elite parachute regiment of the French Army. It used to serve as the armed branch of the SDECE. Its insignia, designed by lieutenant Dupas, features Bagheera in the moonlight and a golden wing. The motto is Qui ose gagne ("who dares wins"), in continuation of the tradition of the British Special Air Service.

History 
The 11e choc was meant from the start to constitute a reserve of soldiers available to the French special services. The 11e choc was initially composed of one single battalion, the 11e bataillon parachutiste de choc. From 1 September 1946, it was stationed in Mont-Louis.

In the aftermath of the Second World War, an "action service" of the SDECE was created by Jacques Morlane. It grouped veterans of the Second World War having served in the Bataillon de Choc of 1936, in the 1er bataillon de choc (founded in 1943), or as SOE agents, as well as veterans of Indochina. 

In spring of 1947, Morlane sent R. Mautaint in Mont-Louis to train the new unit. Mautaint had authored numerous reports on SOE training that inspired that of the French services.

In July 1947, as the complement of the 11e choc grew, Morlane nominated Paul Aussaresses to replace Mautaint. Aussaresses described his mission as "perform what was by then called 'psychological warfare', wherever it was necessary, notably in Indochina (...) I trained my men for clandestine operations, airborne or otherwise, that could range from building demolition to sabotage or elimination of enemies". From 1952, elements of the 11e choc were sent to Indochina to lead and train the Groupement de commandos mixtes aéroportés (GCMA), though the 11e Choc did not take part in the conflict as a unit.

Back from Indochina in 1952, Aussaresses was tasked to assassinate supporters of the FLN. Morlane "was convinced that a Soviet invasion was imminent, and had been busy constituting secret weapon caches all over the territory so that, when time would come, a resistance could be organised".

On 1 October 1955, a 12e bataillon parachutiste de choc was created. It was stationed in Calvi and Corte, in Corsica. Together, the 11th and 12th Battalions were the 11e demi-brigade parachutiste de choc (11e DBPC), also formed on 1 October. The insignia of the 12e BPC featured an eagle and a star on a parachute background.

In late October 1956, elements of both battalions took part in the Suez Crisis.

The 12e BPC was disbanded on 30 April 1957 and immediately re-created as the 1er bataillon parachutiste de choc. Its insignia featured a dagger with a map of France as background, and its motto was En pointe toujours ("at the tip, always"). From 1 May 1957, the 11e DBPC was thus constituted of the 11th BPC, the 1st BPC and the bataillon d'instruction spécialisé (BIS, "training special battalion"), based in Calvi, Corté, Collioure, and Mont-Louis.

During the Algerian War, the 11e Choc at first deployed a groupement léger d'intervention (GLI, "light intervention group"), and later a groupement de marche (GM 11.DBPC), as well as local antennas of the "action service", and a specialised detachment called DS 111. 

The 11e Choc did not take part in the Algiers putsch of 1961, but some officers did sympathise towards the putschists. The unit was disbanded on 31 December 1963 and its standard handed over to the National Commando Training Center at Mont-Louis. 

In 1985, general René Imbot, director of the DGSE, re-created the 11e Choc as the 11e régiment parachutiste de choc (11e RPC). In 1988, elements took part in the Ouvéa cave assault.

The restructuring of the French Intelligence and Special Operations organs following the Gulf War entailed the disbanding of the 11e RPC on 31 December 1993.

Commanding officers

11e bataillon parachutiste de choc 

 1946-1947 : CNE Mautaint
 1947 : CNE Rivière
 1947-1948 : CNE Paul Aussaresses
 1948-1953 : CBN Yves Godard
 1953-1955 : CES Pierre Decorse
 1955-1957 : CNE Bauer
 1958-1960 : CNE Erouart
 1960-1961 : CBN Crousillac
 1961-1962 : CBN Mouton
 1962-1963 : CBN Dabezies
 1963 : CBN Barthes

11e demi-brigade parachutiste de choc 

 1955-1961 : COL Pierre Decorse
 1961-1963 : LCL Albert Merglen

References 

 Erwan Bergot, 11e Choc, Presses de la cité, 1986

Parachute infantry regiments of France
Military units and formations established in 1947
Military units and formations disestablished in 1993
20th-century regiments of France